Bugun, also known as Khowa, is a small possible language isolate spoken in Arunachal Pradesh state of India by the Bugun. They numbered about 1,700 in 2011.

Classification
Bugun is classified as a Kho-Bwa language in Blench & Post (2013), although Blench (2015) believes Bugun may actually be unrelated to the rest of the Kho-Bwa languages.

Dialects
Lieberherr & Bodt (2017) list the following Bugun dialects along with their numbers of speakers.
Dikhyang (100 speakers)
Singchung (680 speakers)
Wangho (220 speakers)
Bichom (630 speakers)
Kaspi (80 speakers)
Namphri (180 speakers)

Distribution
Bugun is spoken in the following villages in southern West Kameng District, Arunachal Pradesh (Dondrup 1990:iv). The total population numbered 800 in 1981. Names in parentheses are spellings as given in Ethnologue.
Wanghoo (Wangho)
Singchung
Kaspi (New Kaspi)
Lichini
Ramo (Ramu)
Namphri
Chithu (Situ)
Sachida (Sachita)
Pani-Phu
Ditching
Dikhiyang (Dikiang)
Bicham (Bichom) (a recently founded hamlet)

Ethnologue also lists Mangopom village. These villages are located on the mountains on both sides of Rupa River, and are interspersed among Aka villages.

References

Kho-Bwa languages
Languages of India
Endangered languages of India
Language isolates of Asia